The 2014–15 Ukrainian Second League was the 24th season of 3rd level professional football in Ukraine.  The competition commenced 25 July 2014 when Arsenal-Kyivshchyna Bila Tserkva hosted Shakhtar-3 Donetsk in Bila Tserkva. The competition resumed from the winter break with the postponed Round 16 match between Skala Stryi and NPHU-Makiyivvuhillya Nikopol on 21 March 2015.

Competition format
Ten teams are competing in three stages of round-robin tournament. All teams will play each other in regular format with the first 16 rounds are scheduled for the fall of 2014, while the rest two are planned for the spring of 2015. The draw of the third stage will be based on results of the first two.

Team changes

Admitted teams
 No teams were admitted by the PFL after playing in the 2014 Ukrainian Football Amateur League and passing attestation.
FC Zorya Bilozirya that finished at the final group stage submitted a license prior to the season but merged with FC Slavutych Cherkasy (already playing in the Second League). The club was renamed to FC Cherkaskyi Dnipro.

Relegated teams
 No teams were relegated from the Ukrainian First League from the previous season.

Suspended teams

Shakhtar Sverdlovsk were suspended from the PFL before the start of the 2014–15 season due to the insurgency in Donbass.

Withdrawn teams

 FC Karlivka failed to submit a license and withdrew from the PFL.

Location map 
The following displays the location of teams.

League table

Results

Round by round
The following table represents the teams position after each round in the competition.

Promotion/relegation play-off
A promotion/relegation home and away play-off is to be played by the 3rd place team of 2014–15 Ukrainian Second League against the 14th placed team of the 2014–15 Ukrainian First League competition. Seedings for the playoff were announced in Ukrainian House of Football on May 29.

First leg

Second leg

Kremin Kremenchuk loses 1–0 on aggregate and remains in Second League

Top goalscorers

See also
 2014–15 Ukrainian Premier League
 2014–15 Ukrainian Premier League Reserves and Under 19
 2014–15 Ukrainian First League
 2014–15 Ukrainian Cup

References

Ukrainian Second League seasons
3
Uk